A slunk is an animal, especially a calf, born prematurely or abortively.  Slunk skin, calfskin typically obtained as a byproduct of cattle slaughter, is also known as chickenskin.

Slunk skin is sold commercially and used for example in furniture, drums, and gloves.

References

External links

Cattle
Hides (skin)
Leathermaking
Furniture-making